The  Synagogue of Alanta is a former synagogue in Alanta, Molėtai District Municipality, Lithuania.

One of 17 wooden synagogues remaining in Lithuania.

Structure 

The synagogue is a wooden log structure of rectangular plan, built on a rough-stone concrete foundation and divided into two floors in the west. The structure is spanned with a hipped rafter roof covered with tin. On the exterior, the building is protected with horizontal weather-boarding above the windowsills of the prayer hall, and a vertical one below them. A prayer hall of almost square plan is situated on the eastern side. On the western side, the building includes a vestibule and a small room with a stove, which also heated the prayer hall. A staircase in the southwestern corner leads to a women's section on the first floor, which opens to the prayer hall with two long rectangular windows. The main entrance to the building is in the western wall and the women's entrance is on the southern wall. Ten round-headed windows opened from the prayer hall: three windows on the southern and northern walls and two pairs of windows on the eastern wall. The windows of the vestibule and the women's section are rectangular. The ceilings are joisted flat constructions; that of the prayer hall is supported by two large beams, resting on the western wall of the women's section and the eastern wall of the prayer hall.

History 
Built in second half of 19th century. Operated until 1941. After World War II it was used as grain warehouse. After Lithuanian Independence the building was returned to Lithuanian Jewish community and synagogue listed as protected building.

Rabbi Benjamin Gittelshon served as the Rabbi here

Current state 
Neither a bimah (presumably at the center), nor a Torah ark (presumably at the eastern wall) has survived.

In 2015 emergency repair works was carried out. In 2020 the reconstruction works started.

See also
Lithuanian Jews

References 

Synagogues in Lithuania
Alanta